Launched during the 2013 Shanghai Auto Show, Fengdu (风度) is a sub-brand of Zhengzhou Nissan, a subsidiary of Dongfeng Automobile. As the aim of the Fengdu brand is to focus on producing affordable Crossover utility vehicles, the product line of the brand started by producing out of production Nissan CUVs bearing the Dongfeng logo.

History
Dongfeng Automobile Company has decided to diversify the Dongfeng CUV product line. For this purpose the sub-brand of Fengdu was created. Older Nissan tooling was set up in China by Zhengzhou-Nissan to produce the second generation Nissan X-Trail rebadged as the Dongfeng Fengdu MX6.

Products
The current Fengdu range comprises the following models:
Dongfeng Fengdu MX3
Dongfeng Fengdu MX5, a compact five-door CUV based on the Aeolus AX7 
Dongfeng Fengdu MX6, a compact five-door CUV based on the Nissan X-Trail

References

Further reading

External links
 

Dongfeng Motor